The Alfabia Mountains are a mountain range in Majorca located in the municipality of Fornalutx.

Landforms of Mallorca
Mountain ranges of the Balearic Islands